Bellevue Historic District is roughly bounded by U.S. 93, Cedar, 4th, and Oak Sts. in Bellevue, Idaho.  The Late Victorian style buildings date as far back as 1880, and are significant for their architecture.  The district was added to the National Register of Historic Places in 1982.

It included 24 buildings.

References

Historic districts on the National Register of Historic Places in Idaho
Geography of Blaine County, Idaho
National Register of Historic Places in Blaine County, Idaho
Bellevue, Idaho